Troy Jayson Sanders (born September 8, 1973) is an American musician, best known as a member of heavy metal band Mastodon, in which he plays bass and sings alongside guitarist Brent Hinds and drummer Brann Dailor. He is also active in Killer Be Killed and Gone Is Gone, as well as being the current touring bassist for Thin Lizzy.

Biography 

Sanders first played when he had picked up his older brother Kyle's bass and decided to try it out, even though the bass was strung for a lefty, and he was right-handed. A few months later, he had talked his dad into buying him a bass. He started first playing in such bands as Four Hour Fogger, Knuckle and Puaka Balava. In 1995, Sanders joined the grindcore band Social Infestation as the bass player. Social Infestation has released one EP and two full-length albums. The band hasn't released any material since 2000 and are seemingly taking a long hiatus or the band has split.

In 2000, Sanders met Brann Dailor and Bill Kelliher along with Brent Hinds at a High on Fire show and later formed Mastodon. The four began a new musical venture with then singer Eric Saner, touring the Southern United States, working 40-hour weeks and committing to the band in their spare time. The band's mainstream success would ensue after Saner left the band, pushing Sanders to the forefront not just as a bassist, but as a vocalist also, the duties of which he would share with Hinds.

In 2012, Sanders joined the supergroup Killer Be Killed, founded by The Dillinger Escape Plan vocalist Greg Puciato and Soulfly/ex-Sepultura frontman Max Cavalera. The band had been working on a lineup and material before announcing their name in October 2013. They released their self-titled debut record through Nuclear Blast Records on May 13, 2014.

In 2016, Sanders formed Gone Is Gone, a supergroup also consisting of Troy Van Leeuwen, a guitar player for Queens of the Stone Age, Tony Hajjar, the drummer for At the Drive-In, and Mike Zarin, a multi-instrumentalist who appeared with Van Leeuwen on Sweethead's Descent to the Surface. They released an EP in the summer of 2016, shortly followed by a studio album, Echolocation, the following year. Since then, the band has continued to record together, releasing singles in 2018 and 2019.

Influence and style

Musical style 
Sanders plays primarily fingerstyle, although he sometimes uses a pick, and usually steps out of the guitar parts in Mastodon, and composes his basslines on his own. He has shown a wide variety of playing styles and techniques, so he is known as a very flexible player.

Singing style 
Sanders performs clean and harsh vocals in Mastodon, where he shares lead vocal duties with Brent Hinds and Brann Dailor. His harsher vocal style is similar to Dave Edwardson of Neurosis and Buzz Osborne of the Melvins, utilizing low growls but not low enough to be death grunts. His harsh vocalism was largely applied in Mastodon's earlier Lifesblood and Remission. In Mastodon's more recent albums, Leviathan through Emperor of Sand, Sanders utilizes a different range of clean vocals along with his harsher style.

Influences 
Sanders has cited Cliff Burton from Metallica, Gene Simmons from Kiss, and Phil Lynott from Thin Lizzy as some of the major influences on his bass playing. He has also stated in interviews that his favorite albums are Men at Work's Business as Usual, Neurosis' Times of Grace, and George Jones' Anniversary – 10 Years of Hits. Adding to that list, in a 2005 interview, he also mentioned Through Silver in Blood by Neurosis, Sailing the Seas of Cheese by Primus, Melvins' Stoner Witch, Metallica's Ride the Lightning, and White Pony by Deftones as some of his favorites.

Personal life 
Sanders is married and has two children, a son and a daughter. Sanders has two brothers, Kyle and Darren, who are both involved in music. Kyle was the bassist of Bloodsimple, and is in MonstrO, and metal supergroup Hellyeah; while Darren is "a one man road crew" and bass tech for Mastodon.

Discography

Social Infestation 
Social Infestation (1996)
Redemption Is Only Skin Deep...It's Time to Cut Deeper (1998)
Lasciate Ogni Speranza (2000)

Mastodon 

Remission (2002) – bass, vocals
Leviathan (2004) – bass, vocals
Blood Mountain (2006) – bass, vocals
Crack the Skye (2009) – bass, bass synth, vocals
The Hunter (2011) – bass, vocals
Once More 'Round the Sun (2014) – bass, vocals, bass pedals, keyboards
Emperor of Sand (2017) – bass, vocals, bass pedals
Hushed and Grim (2021) – bass, vocals

Killer Be Killed 
Killer Be Killed (2014) – bass, vocals
Reluctant Hero (2020) – bass, vocals

Gone Is Gone 
Gone Is Gone (2016) – bass, vocals
Echolocation (2017) – bass, vocals

Guest appearances 
 "Back to the Mountain" by Yakuza on the album Samsara, (vocals)
 "Until Man Exists No More" by Dozer on the album Through the Eyes of Heathens, (vocals)
 In 2013, Sanders starred in a commercial for Orange Amplification's Micro Terror
 "Let Darkness Fall" by Metal Allegiance on the album Metal Allegiance, (vocals)
 "Liars & Thieves" by Metal Allegiance on their second album Volume II – Power Drunk Majesty (vocals)
 "Crack of Doom" by Kvelertak on the album Splid (vocals)
 "Fought the Line" by Dub Trio on the album The Shape of Dub to Come, (vocals)

References

External links 

Mastodon's official website
Troy joins Warwick
Troy Sanders' Gear

American heavy metal bass guitarists
American male bass guitarists
American heavy metal singers
1973 births
Living people
Progressive metal bass guitarists
Mastodon (band) members
21st-century American singers
Place of birth missing (living people)
21st-century American bass guitarists
21st-century American male singers
Killer Be Killed members